William A. "Andy" Brown (born April 5, 1958) was a vice admiral in the United States Navy last serving as the director for logistics, J4 for the Joint Chiefs of Staff.

Currently serves as President and CEO of NDTA (National Defense Transportation Association)

Brown previously served as the United States Transportation Command (USTRANSCOM) deputy commander at Scott Air Force Base, Illinois, and USTRANSCOM director of Strategy, Policy, Programs and Logistics (J5/4).

Early life and education
Brown was raised in Gloucester County, Virginia, and attended the Virginia Military Institute as a Naval Reserve Officers Training Corps scholarship student. He graduated from the Institute in 1980 and was commissioned as a Navy ensign in the same year.

Brown went on to receive his master's degree in business administration in 1990 from the Naval Postgraduate School and later attended the Stanford Graduate School of Business Executive Training Program in 2004.

Assignments
In the course of his career he has completed the following assignments:

 June 1980 – December 1980, Student, Navy Supply Corps School, Athens, Georgia
 December 1980 – April 1983, Disbursing Officer, Wardroom Officer, Stock Control Officer, USS John F. Kennedy (CV-67), Norfolk, Virginia
 September 1983 – January 1985, Naval Acquisition Contracting Officer Intern, Naval Air Systems Command, Washington, D.C.
 May 1985 – October 1986, Aide to the Commander, Naval Air Systems Command, Washington, D.C.
 January 1987 – May 1989, Supply Officer, USS Leftwich (DD-984), Pearl Harbor, Hawaii
 May 1989 – December 1990, Student, Naval Post Graduate School, Monterey, California 
 December 1990 – November 1993, H-60 Weapons Manager and Contracts Division director, Naval Aviation Supply Office, Philadelphia, Pennsylvania
 November 1993 – November 1996, Carrier Supply Operations Officer, Naval Air Force, U.S. Atlantic Fleet, Norfolk, Virginia
 November 1996 – April 1999, Operations Action Officer, Naval Supply Systems Command, Mechanicsburg, Pennsylvania.
 April 1999 – March 2001, Supply Officer USS George Washington (CVN-73), Norfolk, Virginia
 March 2001 – April 2003, Operations Director, Naval Inventory Control Point, Philadelphia, Philadelphia
 April 2003 – July 2006, Force Supply Officer, commander, Naval Air Forces, San Diego, California
 August 2006 – July 2008, Director of Ordnance Supply/Fleet Supply Officer U.S. Fleet Forces Command, Norfolk, Virginia
 July 2008 – June 2009, Commander, Fleet and Industrial Supply Centers, San Diego, California
 July 2009 - July 2012, Director of Logistics, US European Command
 July 2012 - August 2015, J5/J4 and Deputy Commander, US Transportation Command 
 August 2015 - October 2017, Director of Logistics (J4), Joint Staff

Awards and decorations
Vice Adm. Brown has been awarded the following decorations and awards:

Rear Admiral Brown is a qualified Naval Aviation Supply Corps Officer and Surface Warfare Supply Corps Officer. Admiral Brown is a 1989 recipient of the Navy League's Vice Admiral Robert F. Batchelder Award and a 2017 Distinguished Alumni Award from the Naval Postgraduate School

Dates of promotion
 Ensign May 16, 1980
 Lieutenant (Junior Grade) May 28, 1982
 Lieutenant June 1, 1984
 Lieutenant Commander September 1, 1990
 Commander August 1, 1995
 Captain June 1, 2001
 Rear Admiral (Lower Half) April 1, 2008
 Rear Admiral August 1, 2011
 Vice Admiral October 18, 2013
 Retired from Active Duty 1 November 2017
 President and CEO of National Defense Transportation Association November 2017
 Fellow, Institute for Defense and Business 2017-2018

References

United States Navy vice admirals
Virginia Military Institute alumni
People from Gloucester County, Virginia
Living people
1960 births